is a railway station in the city of Anjō, Aichi Prefecture, Japan, operated by Central Japan Railway Company (JR Tōkai).

Lines
Anjō Station is served by the Tōkaidō Main Line, and is located 333.7 kilometers from the starting point of the line at Tokyo Station.

Station layout
The station has an island platform and two side platforms serving four tracks connected by a footbridge; however, only tracks 2 and 3 on the island platform are in normal operations. Track 1 is used for chartered and peak hour services, and use of track four was completely discontinued in 2010. The elevated station building has automated ticket machines, TOICA automated turnstiles and a staffed ticket office.

Platforms

Adjacent stations

|-
!colspan=5|Central Japan Railway Company

Station history
Anjō Station was opened 16 June 1891 when the section of the Japanese Government Railways (JGR) line connecting Okazaki with Kariya was completed. This line was named Tōkaidō Line in 1895, and the Tōkaidō Main Line in 1909. An all-freight spur line operated by the privately held Hekinan Electric Railway connected Anjō to Hekinan in 1939 and began passenger operations from March 1951, but was discontinued in 1961. In October 1980, the JNR discontinued all freight services to Anjō Station. With the privatization and dissolution of the JNR on 1 April 1987, the station came under the control of the Central Japan Railway Company. At that time, an additional side platform was constructed.

Station numbering was introduced to the section of the Tōkaidō Line operated JR Central in March 2018; Anjō Station was assigned station number CA54.

Passenger statistics
In fiscal 2017, the station was used by an average of 11,619 passengers daily (boarding passengers only).

Surrounding area
Anjō city hall
Hekikai Shinkin Bank head office

See also
 List of Railway Stations in Japan

References

Yoshikawa, Fumio. Tokaido-sen 130-nen no ayumi. Grand-Prix Publishing (2002) .

External links

  

Railway stations in Japan opened in 1891
Railway stations in Aichi Prefecture
Tōkaidō Main Line
Stations of Central Japan Railway Company
Anjō, Aichi